Juska Samuli Savolainen (born 1 September 1983) is a Finnish former footballer who played as a midfielder. He ended his career due to persisting injuries in 2011.

Career
Savolainen represented Tampere United until January 2008. He moved to United for the season 2006 from AC Allianssi. He has also represented FC Hämeenlinna and FC KooTeePee in the Finnish Premier Division.

In January 2008, Savolainen moved to the Norwegian club Rosenborg BK. In 2009, he was loaned out to his former club Tampere United from 17 March until 31 July. In 2009, he signed for FK Haugesund.

Career statistics

International career
On 18 January 2010 Savolainen made his first appearance for Finland national football team. Savolainen was at starting line-up in friendly match against South Korea at Málaga, Spain. On 25 May 2010 he had his second and last match for the national team against Estonia.

Honours

Club
Tampere United
Veikkausliiga Championship: 2007

Rosenborg BK
Norwegian Premier League Championship: 2009

References

Finnish footballers
Finland international footballers
Footballers from Helsinki
SC Heerenveen players
FC Hämeenlinna players
Tampere United players
Rosenborg BK players
FK Haugesund players
Finnish expatriate footballers
Expatriate footballers in the Netherlands
Finnish expatriate sportspeople in the Netherlands
Expatriate footballers in Norway
Finnish expatriate sportspeople in Norway
Veikkausliiga players
Eliteserien players
1983 births
Living people
Association football midfielders